Baron Sanderson of Ayot, of Welwyn in the County of Hertford, is a title in the Peerage of the United Kingdom. It was created in 1960 for the businessman and public servant, Basil Sanderson. He was the son of the shipping magnate Harold Arthur Sanderson, general manager of the White Star Line, and himself was chairman and president of the Shipping Federation. On Lord Sanderson of Ayot's death in 1971 he was succeeded by his elder twin son Alan Lindsay Sanderson. However, he disclaimed the peerage for life the same year.

Barons Sanderson of Ayot (1960)
Basil Sanderson, 1st Baron Sanderson of Ayot (1894–1971)
Alan Lindsay Sanderson, 2nd Baron Sanderson of Ayot (b. 1931) (disclaimed 1971)

The heir apparent is the former 2nd Baron's son Hon. Michael Sanderson (b. 1959).
The next in line is the former 2nd Baron's younger twin brother Hon. Murray Lee Sanderson (b. 1931), whose heir is his only son Basil (b. 1974).

Line of succession

  Basil Sanderson, 1st Baron Sanderson of Ayot (1894–1971)
 Alan Lindsay Sanderson (born 1931) (disclaimed 1971)
 (1) Hon. Michael Sanderson (b. 1959)
 (2) Hon. Evelyn Sanderson (b. 1961)
 Hon. Murray Lee Sanderson (1931–2017)
 (3) Basil Sanderson (b. 1974)

References

Kidd, Charles, Williamson, David (editors). Debrett's Peerage and Baronetage (1990 edition). New York: St Martin's Press, 1990.

Baronies in the Peerage of the United Kingdom
Noble titles created in 1960